Atricordyceps is a genus of fungi within the Clavicipitaceae family.

References

Sordariomycetes genera
Clavicipitaceae